The Diocese of New England is a diocese of the Orthodox Church in America (OCA).  Its territory includes parishes, monasteries, and missions located in six states in New England – Connecticut, Maine, Massachusetts, New Hampshire, Rhode Island, and Vermont.  The diocesan chancery is located in Southbridge, Massachusetts.

The last bishop of New England was the Right Reverend Nikon (Liolin), who was elected to the position of Bishop of Boston and the Albanian Archdiocese on October 22, 2003. He was installed as Bishop of Boston, New England, and the Albanian Archdiocese during ceremonies taking place from December 16–18, 2005. Archbishop Nikon died on September 1, 2019. On September 10, 2019, the OCA announced that Metropolitan Tikhon (Mollard) will be the locum tenens for the diocese until a successor is found.

Deaneries 

The diocese is grouped geographically into three deaneries, each consisting of a number of parishes. Each deanery is headed by a parish priest, known as a dean. The deans coordinate activities in their area's parishes, and report to the diocesan bishop. The current deaneries of the Diocese of New England and their territories are:

 Boston Deanery – Massachusetts and Rhode Island
 Connecticut Deanery – Connecticut and Massachusetts
 Northern Deanery – Maine, New Hampshire, and Vermont

References

External links
 Official site

New England
Eastern Orthodoxy in Connecticut
Christianity in Maine
Eastern Orthodoxy in Massachusetts
Christianity in New Hampshire
Christianity in Rhode Island
Christianity in Vermont
Religion in New England